Im Jyoung-Hwa (Hangul: 임정화, Hanja: 任貞化; born December 7, 1986 in Ulsan, Gyeongsangnam-do, South Korea) is a South Korean weightlifter.

She won the silver medal at the 2005 Junior World Championships in the 58 kg category, lifting a total of 212 kg.

At the 2007 World Weightlifting Championships she ranked 8th in the 53 kg category.

She participated in the 2008 Olympic Games in Beijing, China, and finished in 4th place in the 48 kg weightclass.

Notes and references

External links
 Athlete Biography at beijing2008

1986 births
Living people
South Korean female weightlifters
Olympic weightlifters of South Korea
Weightlifters at the 2008 Summer Olympics
Weightlifters at the 2002 Asian Games
Weightlifters at the 2014 Asian Games
Sportspeople from Ulsan
Asian Games competitors for South Korea
Olympic medalists in weightlifting
Olympic silver medalists for South Korea
Medalists at the 2008 Summer Olympics
20th-century South Korean women
21st-century South Korean women